The College of New Jersey (TCNJ) is a public university in Ewing Township, New Jersey. It is part of New Jersey's public system of higher education. Established in 1855 as the New Jersey State Normal School, TCNJ was the first normal school, or teaching college, in the state of New Jersey and the fifth in the United States. It was originally located in Trenton proper and moved to its present location in adjacent Ewing Township during the early to mid-1930s. Since its inception, TCNJ has undergone several name changes, the most recent being the 1996 change from Trenton State College to its current name.

The institution is organized into seven schools, all of which offer bachelor's degree programs and several of which offer master's degree programs. Emphasis is placed on liberal arts education via the college's general education requirements. Much of TCNJ is built in Georgian colonial revival architecture style on 289 tree-lined acres.

History

The College of New Jersey was established on February 9, 1855, by an act of the New Jersey Legislature mandating the creation of a state normal school, making the New Jersey State Normal School the first teacher training institution in New Jersey and the ninth in the United States. Prior to this, then-Governor Rodman McCamley Price had actively promoted the notion of founding a training institute for New Jersey's teachers and helped to mobilize support among influential state leaders: 

For the first 73 years, the school was located in Trenton on Clinton Avenue. Beginning in 1925, the institution offered its first four-year baccalaureate degrees, and engaged in a transitional program of expansion. The first building erected on the new campus was Green Hall, built in traditional Georgian colonial style. The majority of buildings now on campus reflect Green Hall's architecture. In 1996, in a move spearheaded by its president, Harold Eickhoff, The College of New Jersey adopted its current name.

Programs in the graduate study were instituted in 1947, followed by accreditation from various national associations in the 1950s. The enactment of the Higher Education Act of 1966 paved the way for TCNJ to become a comprehensive institution by expanding its degree programs into a variety of fields aside from the education of teachers. By 1972, 70 percent of entering students were selecting non-education majors.

 Names
 1855 — New Jersey State Normal School
 1908 — New Jersey State Normal School in Trenton
 1929 — New Jersey State Teachers College and State Normal School at Trenton
 1937 — New Jersey State Teachers College at Trenton
 1958 — Trenton State College
 1996 — The College of New Jersey

Academics

More than 50 liberal arts and professional programs are offered through the college's seven schools: Arts and Communication; Business; Education; Engineering; Humanities and Social Sciences; Nursing, Health and Exercise Science; and Science.

The College of New Jersey offers degrees in over 50 liberal arts and professional programs. TCNJ also offers a 7-year combined B.S./M.D. (Bachelor of Science/Doctor of Medicine) program for graduating high school students in conjunction with University of Medicine and Dentistry of New Jersey. Admission into this program is highly selective. This program offers guaranteed admission to UMDNJ upon completion of three years of undergraduate study at TCNJ and the maintenance of a minimum 3.5 GPA.

These programs are organized within seven schools:
 School of the Arts and Communication
 School of Business
 School of Humanities and Social Sciences
 School of Education
 School of Engineering
 School of Nursing, Health and Exercise Science
 School of Science

Global programs
The TCNJ Center for Global Engagement works together with TCNJ faculty to offer undergraduate students a wide variety of programs, from short-term, faculty-led study abroad programs to semester- and year-long programs in dozens of countries.

Rankings
According to U.S. News & World Report’s recent rankings, TCNJ ranks #5 in the Regional Universities North category. U.S. News & World Report also ranks TCNJ the #1 in Top Public Schools in the Northeast USA, #2 in Best Colleges for Veterans, #7 in Most Innovative Schools, #6 in Best Undergraduate Teaching, top #100 in the United States in Best Value Schools as well as high ranking Engineering and Nursing programs. The Princeton Review, in their recent ranking, ranked TCNJ #47 for the "Best Value College" rankings.

Campus life

Residence halls
First-year students at TCNJ are either given a room assignment in Travers/Wolfe Tower, Centennial Hall, or any empty rooms in the Allen/Brewster/Ely Complex. Second-year students live in New Residence, Allen Hall, Brewster Hall, Ely Hall, Norsworthy Hall, Eickhoff Hall, Cromwell Hall, and Decker Hall. There are currently plans to construct another building specifically for second-year housing. Upperclassmen typically live in Townhouses South, East or West, or in one of the two newly constructed apartment complexes; Phelps Hall and Hausdoerffer Hall. Upperclassmen may also live in one of the various College Houses that surround the campus. While 95 percent of first-year students live on campus, only 50 percent of upperclassmen live on campus, instead choosing to live in homes and apartments surrounding the college.

Campus Town
In 2013 groundbreaking began for The Campus Town complex. Consisting of seven buildings — Campus Town Clock Tower, apartments and recreation space — Campus Town was built by PRC Campus Centers LLC on 12 acres of property located on campus and it has 80,000 square feet of commercial space.

The Campus Town complex has space to house 446 juniors and seniors in one-, two- and four-bedroom apartments. Each apartment has a living room/dining area, separate bedrooms, one or two bathrooms depending upon the unit, a full kitchen with a dishwasher and a full-sized washer and dryer. The complex has 500 parking spots.

The Campus Town complex houses an 11,500-square-foot fitness center that replaced the college's 4,000-square-foot gym. The apartments and the fitness center are only open to the students, but the complex's retail stores will be open to the public. Barnes & Noble is an anchor tenant, with a 14,000-square-foot store. Other facilities include Panera, Jersey Mike's, a yogurt shop, sushi restaurant, convenience store and brewpub.

Dining
There are currently ten Sodexo operated dining facilities on the TCNJ campus as well as a convenience store and bookstore (where convenience store-like food and beverages are sold). Eickhoff hall houses The Atrium at Eickhoff, the main dining hall, where students pay a door price and have access to buffet-style food, along with The 1855 Room, a staff/faculty dining room, and the convenience store. TDubs, the late-night dining hall, is located between the Travers and Wolfe towers. The Brower Student Center is home to three different dining facilities.

Entrepreneurship

In the mid-2000s, TCNJ began to put a more concentrated effort on student entrepreneurship. Administrative resources were put toward counselling and workshops for students. The Mayo Business Plan Competition in April 2012 saw numerous student groups competing for $12,000 to launch their start-up businesses. The school has also held entrepreneurship events for local high school students.

Student life

TCNJ has numerous student organizations managed by the Office of Student Activities and Leadership Development. TCNJ provides non-alcohol-related social events for students, including both on and off-campus activities such as musical and comedic performances. The College Union Board (CUB) sponsors visits by celebrities as well as movie showings, all of which are funded by the Student Finance Board. In April 2011, the College Union Board, Student Finance Board, and Student Government held their first annual Spring Carnival entitled "fun.ival" (fun.ival was named after live performers, fun.). In addition, nearby metropolitan areas such as Philadelphia and New York City are an hour and a half or less away by train.

Greek life at TCNJ are governed by the Inter-Greek Council, whose purpose is to unite the members of the Greek community in spirit of mutual interest. It organizes and governs activities, highlights goals and opens lines of communication between the members of the organizations and the rest of the campus community. The Inter-Greek Council recognizes 30 organizations; 16 sororities, 12 fraternities, and 3 coed organizations.

The recognized Greek organizations at TCNJ are:

Brower Student Center

The Brower Student Center (BSC) is the student center on campus. The BSC was originally built in 1976, and has continued to serve the students through the present day. The Brower Student Center seeks to provide on-campus activities for all the students of TCNJ as well as maintain partnerships within the community that accentuate the student and community experience. A game room is also located in the student center, complete with multiple pool tables, TVs with Nintendo Wiis connected, ping pong, and other games.

The building is home to all of the student organizations on campus, as well as the dining facilities that are run by Sodexo Incorporated and a campus bookstore. All recognized student organizations have an office or cubicle, or at least a meeting area. Most of these are located on the second level, but there are a handful located elsewhere. The student-run newspaper, for example, has both its business office and production room in the basement.

The building was named after former president Clayton R. Brower, who served as president during the time that TCNJ was referred to as Trenton State College. His wife, Dorothy Brower, was an active volunteer in the surrounding community.

Renovations for the new Brower Student Center began in April 2015, and were finished in 2017.

Museums and exhibits
The College of New Jersey is home to the David Sarnoff Museum, formerly located at Princeton Junction. The collection detailing the life of NBC founder David Sarnoff is now located in Roscoe L. West Hall. Various art exhibits can be found in galleries at the Art and IMM building. The exhibits feature the work of student artists, professional artists and local artists. The exhibits are updated regularly.

Campus media

Publications 
The Signal has been The College of New Jersey's student-run newspaper since 1855. It has won numerous awards, and has placed first many times in the General Excellence category (the highest category) for collegiate news publications at the New Jersey Press Association awards. The Signal is run almost entirely out of their office located on Forcina Hall's second floor.

TCNJ Magazine is another publication, covering both current campus life and alumni affairs. The Perspective, an openly left-leaning student news booklet, is the school's newest publication having been first published in 2009. The Perspective received funding from the Student Finance Board, but so far has no established publishing schedule (as opposed to other campus publications). On the literary side, The Lion's Eye and The Siren are both student-made magazines filled with poetry, prose and artwork by students. The Seal was TCNJ's yearbook since its first publication in 1911. However, following the 2017 edition, the publication and student organization were discontinued due to low demand and incumbent debt.

Radio 
WTSR (91.3 FM) is the college's non-commercial radio station which services Mercer County and Bucks County, Pennsylvania while also broadcasting over the internet. The station began in 1958 as WTSC, but was approved for an FM license in the fall of 1965. The station is fully student run and enlists the help of both students and community volunteers. The station offers traditional dayside programming while also offering a variety of specialty programming that consists of shows featuring folk/world, synth-pop, modern rock, metal, reggae, oldies, gospel, and more.

Television 
Lions Television (abbreviated 'LTV') has been the student run television station on campus since 2008. Its studio and office are located in Kendall Hall and its content can be viewed online or on campus televisions on channel 2-2. The station board includes six producers (sports, news, music, comedy, pop culture and game show) who film, direct and edit content both in studio and around the school's campus.

Athletics

The College of New Jersey has 22 varsity teams and 18 club teams, including multiple programs that have achieved national recognition and success. Its varsity teams are members of the New Jersey Athletic Conference (NJAC) and compete in Division III of the National Collegiate Athletic Association (NCAA). The college's mascot is "Roscoe the Lion."

TCNJ's varsity teams are the top combined first- and second-place finishers of all 424 Division III schools in the nation over more than 25 years.

The women's lacrosse team has played in the championship game 16 out of 20 possible times, winning 11 (though the 1992 title was later vacated) and qualifying for the NCAA tournament 21 consecutive times through 2005, highlighted by a 93–1 record from 1991 to 1996. The women's field hockey team has won 10 Division III crowns in 14 championship appearances (both twice as many as any other school).

The TCNJ wrestling team has placed in the top 20 nationally for 30 consecutive years, including 5 national championships (1979, 1981, 1984, 1985, 1987), 5 runner-up finishes, and numerous finishes in the top 5.

The track and field teams have also dominated the New Jersey Athletic Conference. Since the NJAC title was first contested in 1997, TCNJ has won the title — both indoor and outdoor — each year.

The main athletic facility, Lions Stadium, holds 6,000 spectators and is home to the football, field hockey, lacrosse, and intramural teams. The stadium opened in the fall of 1984 and featured the first North American installation of AstroTurf's vertical-drainage system. This system prevents the "duck-pond effect" commonly seen with other artificial surfaces. In 2008, reports indicated that the turf contained higher-than-acceptable levels of lead and was subsequently removed. Now, the stadium is furnished with Tiger Turf, which is the first installation of the Trophy Turf in the United States. The stadium has hosted multiple NCAA tournaments and championship games, as well as the annual Special Olympics New Jersey and the annual USSBA Central Jersey Regional marching band competition.

The school's club ice hockey team have found success as a member of multiple American Collegiate Hockey Association (ACHA) conferences since the group's creation in 1977. The team currently plays in the Colonial State College Hockey Conference where it began play as a founding member in 2014, has won four conference championships (2017, 2018, 2019, 2020), and earned bids to the ACHA Southeast Regional Tournament. Prior to this as a member of the Great Northeast Collegiate Hockey Conference the team won two conference titles in 2012 and 2014.

TCNJ Cheerleading team has found success in the collegiate cheerleading world since its inception in 2000. In 2014, 2015, 2019, and 2020, the program was crowned National Champions at Universal Cheerleaders Association's College championship among some of the most talented universities and colleges in the country.

Men's sports
Baseball
Basketball
Cross country
Football
Golf
Soccer
Swimming and diving
Tennis
Track and field
Wrestling

Women's sports
Basketball
Cross country
Field hockey
Lacrosse
Soccer
Softball
Swimming and diving
Tennis
Track and field

Club sports
Baseball
Basketball (men and women)
Bowling
Crew
Cheerleading
Dance Team
Ice hockey
Lacrosse (men and women)
Rugby (men and women)
Soccer (men and women)
Softball
Swimming
Tennis
Ultimate frisbee (men and women)
Unified sports (Special Olympics and TCNJ students)
Volleyball (men and women)

Notable alumni

Politics and government

 Christopher J. Brown, Republican Party politician who served in the New Jersey General Assembly from 2012 to 2016, representing the 8th legislative district.
 Georgette Castner (B.S 2002), United States district judge of the United States District Court for the United States District Court for the District of New Jersey from 2022
 Jim Florio (B.A., 1962), Governor of New Jersey, 1990–1994.
 Joe Howarth (B.S.), politician who has represented the 8th Legislative District in the New Jersey General Assembly since 2016.
Enoch L. "Nucky" Johnson, American mobster and political boss of Atlantic City, onetime Atlantic County Treasurer and sheriff
 Dick LaRossa, Republican Party politician who served two terms in the New Jersey Senate, from 1994 to 2000, where he represented the 15th Legislative District.
 Gerald Luongo (B.A., M.A.), Republican Party politician who has served in the New Jersey General Assembly from 1998 to 2000.
 Joseph R. Malone, Republican Party politician who served in the New Jersey General Assembly from 1993 until 2012, representing the 30th legislative district.
 Joseph A. Mussomeli (B.A., 1975), is an American diplomat. Current Ambassador to Slovenia as well as former Ambassador to Cambodia and the Philippines.
 Verlina Reynolds-Jackson, politician who represents the 15th Legislative District in the New Jersey General Assembly.
 Christopher Smith (B.S., 1975), United States Congressman representing New Jersey's 4th congressional district.
 William A. Stevens, jurist and Republican Party politician who served as President of the New Jersey Senate and New Jersey Attorney General.
 Connie Wagner, politician who served in the New Jersey General Assembly from 2008 to 2013, where she represented the 38th Legislative District.
 Madaline A. Williams, first African American woman elected to the New Jersey Legislature.

Arts and entertainment

 Holly Black, author of The Spiderwick Chronicles series and other works
 Jay Black, stand-up comic and screenwriter
 Sheila Callaghan, award-winning playwright and screenwriter
 Stephen Dadaian, electric and classical guitarist
 Jeff Feuerzeig, film director and screenwriter best known for The Devil and Daniel Johnston
 Tom Kraeutler, home improvement broadcast journalist and author
Trudy Krisher, author
 Geraldine Clinton Little, poet
 Kenny and Keith Lucas, a.k.a. "The Lucas Bros.", Academy Award-nominated writers and producers, best known for Judas and the Black Messiah
 Adam Mamawala, stand-up comic
 Tom Scharpling, producer and radio host
 Richard Sterban, member of The Oak Ridge Boys.
 Ty Treadway, One Life to Live soap star and host of Soap Talk on Soapnet cable channel
 Michael Vega, actor

Sports

 Terry Bradway, General Manager of the New York Jets from 2001 to 2006
 Melanie Balcomb, Head Women's Basketball Coach at Vanderbilt University
 Greg Grant, former NBA player
 Eric Hamilton, American football coach
 Gene Hart (B.A., 1952), Hockey Hall of Fame broadcaster and former play-by-play voice of the Philadelphia Flyers
 Tom McCarthy, radio play-by-play voice of the Philadelphia Phillies

Others
Lori Alhadeff, activist
Jessielyn Palumbo, holds the title of Miss New Jersey USA 2016
David L. Richards, political scientist and professor; co-founder of the CIRI Human Rights Data Project
 Richard A. Swanson, organizational theorist and professor
 Geralyn Wolf (M.A., 1971), Bishop of the Episcopal Diocese of Rhode Island
 Julianna White, holds the title of Miss New Jersey USA 2011

Notable faculty

 Juda Bennett – English 
Celia Chazelle – History
 Roy A. Clouser – Philosophy
 Ellen G. Friedman – English and Women's & Gender Studies
 James A. Graham – Psychology
 Jean Graham – English
 Nancy Hingston – Mathematics
 Xinru Liu – History
 Catie Rosemurgy – Creative Writing
 Jess Row – English
 Donna Shaw – Journalism

Demographics

The College of New Jersey is a census-designated place (CDP) covering the TCNJ campus.

It first appeared as a CDP in the 2020 Census with a population of 3,701.

2020 census

Note: the US Census treats Hispanic/Latino as an ethnic category. This table excludes Latinos from the racial categories and assigns them to a separate category. Hispanics/Latinos can be of any race.

See also

List of American state universities
Trenton Computer Festival

Notes

References

External links

 
 TCNJ Athletics website

 
American Association of State Colleges and Universities
Eastern Pennsylvania Rugby Union
Educational institutions established in 1855
Ewing Township, New Jersey
Universities and colleges in Mercer County, New Jersey
Public universities and colleges in New Jersey
1855 establishments in New Jersey